Real Salt Lake Women (previously known as Salt Lake United and Sparta Salt Lake) was an American women's soccer team that was founded in 2008. The team was a founding member of United Women's Soccer league, in the second tier of women’s soccer in the United States and Canada. The team played in the Women's Premier Soccer League from 2008-2015.

Utah Royals FC of the National Women's Soccer League, also owned by Real Salt Lake, created a reserve team that would start play in the Women's Premier Soccer League in 2019. RSL Women was thus folded on January 9, 2019.

Players

Notable former players
 Michele Vasconcelos, Drafted by the Chicago Red Stars (2017)
 Mariah Nogueira, Former player for the Seattle Reign

Year-by-year

Honors
USASA National Women's Open
Runners-up: 2011
Semifinals: 2012
USASA National Women's Amateur
Runners-up: 2013
WPSL Playoffs
Semifinals: 2012
Big Sky Champions: 2012
WPSL Elite Champions: 2015

Coaches

  Dennis Burrows 2008–2014
  Jeff Ginn 2015–2016
  Mark Davis 2016–2019

Stadium
 Physical Education Playfield at Weber State University, Ogden, Utah 2008
 Woods Cross High School Stadium at Woods Cross High School, Woods Cross, Utah 2009
Beetdigger Stadium at Jordan High School, Sandy, Utah, 2010-2013
Rio Tinto Stadium, Sandy, Utah 2012-2013
America First Field, Sandy, Utah 2014
Ute Field, Salt Lake City, Utah 2015
Davis and East High Schools, Salt Lake City, Utah 2016
Clyde Field, Utah Valley University, Orem, Utah 2017-2018

See also
 Utah Royals FC
 Utah soccer clubs

References

External links
 

 
Real Salt Lake
United Women's Soccer teams
Women's soccer clubs in the United States
Soccer clubs in Salt Lake City
2008 establishments in Utah
2019 disestablishments in Utah
Association football clubs established in 2008
Association football clubs disestablished in 2019